Hooker Glacier is located in Shoshone National Forest, in the U.S. state of Wyoming,  WNW of Mount Hooker.

See also
 List of glaciers in the United States

References

Glaciers of Fremont County, Wyoming
Glaciers of Wyoming